John Thomas Tighe ( – ), pronounced "tie", was an American minor league baseball player and a coach, manager and scout for the Detroit Tigers of Major League Baseball.

Biography
Born in Kearny, New Jersey, Tighe joined the professional ranks in 1936 as a catcher with the Charleston Senators, a Detroit farm club in the Class C Middle Atlantic League.

The following season, Tighe became a manager in the minor leagues.

In 1940 and 1941, Tighe was player-manager of the Muskegon Clippers, a Michigan State League Tigers farm club. 

He was a Detroit coach for the latter half of the 1942 American League season, then resumed his minor league managerial career from 1944 to 1953. 

In 1948, Tighe was assigned to be the first manager of the Flint Arrows in the Central League.

He was again named to the coaching staff of the Tigers for 1955–56, replacing his boss, Bucky Harris, as Detroit's manager following the 1956 season. Tighe's career managing record: 99 wins, 104 defeats (.488).

He later managed and scouted in the Milwaukee Braves organization before returning to the Tigers' farm system, winning the 1967 Governors' Cup championship and the 1968 International League regular season championship at the helm of the Toledo Mud Hens. He served full-time with the Detroit Tigers system until 1982 then under various capacities until 1990.

References

External links

1913 births
2002 deaths
Batavia Clippers players
Baseball coaches from New Jersey
Baseball players from New Jersey
Beaumont Exporters players
Buffalo Bisons (minor league) managers
Charleston Senators players
Detroit Tigers coaches
Detroit Tigers managers
Detroit Tigers scouts
Hartford Bees players
Louisville Colonels (minor league) managers
Milwaukee Braves scouts
Minor league baseball managers
Muskegon Reds players
People from Kearny, New Jersey
Toledo Mud Hens managers
Winston-Salem Twins players